Statistics Canada divides Quebec into 98 census divisions largely coextensive with the regional county municipalities of the province (of Quebec's 87 regional county municipalities, 82 have coextensive borders with Statistics Canada census divisions).

Quebec's census divisions consist of numerous census subdivisions. The types of census subdivisions within a Quebec census division may include:
cities and towns (ville), "ordinary" municipalities (municipalité), parish municipalities (paroisse), townships (canton) and united townships (cantons unis), villages (village)
Cree villages (village cri), northern villages (village nordique, i.e., Inuit), and one Naskapi village (village Naskapi)
Land reserved to Crees (Terres réservées aux Cris), Inuit land (Terre inuite), Naskapi land (Terres réservées aux Naskapis)
Indian reserves and Indian settlements
Unorganized territories

List of census divisions
The following is a list of Quebec's census divisions, as of the 2011 census.

See also
 Types of municipalities in Quebec
 Administrative divisions of Quebec
 List of regional county municipalities in Quebec
 Regional county municipality

References

External links
 Statistics Canada: Subprovincial geography levels: Quebec

 
Lists of populated places in Quebec